Teodosije Marićević (Orašac, 1760 - Orašac, 1807) was a Knyaz of Orašac and Jasenica and a merchant. He participated in the first Serbian National assembly at Ostružnica near Belgrade in April and May 1804 during the First Serbian Uprising.

Biography
His partner was also Mladen Milovanović. On the eve of the uprising, as knez (prince) of Orašac and Jasenica, he took part in the Assembly in Orašac (14 February 1804), which decided on the election of the leader of the uprising. 
He rejected the assembly's proposal to become a leader, saying that as a prince he should protect the people in case the uprising fails, which he could not do as a leader of the uprising, in fact, a hajduk, and proposed the election of Karađorđe. In the first phase of the uprising, he was one of the most prominent insurgent elders.

Due to his carelessness, the Serbs suffered a minor defeat in the first conflict with the Turks near Batočina (mid-April 1804), and Tosun Agha managed to break through the road he was guarding without a fight. That is why Karađorđe suspected treason.

When he realized that he was losing power in the principality in Karađorđe's favor, he joined the opposition, the first of the insurgent elders. He openly clashed with Karađorđe at the assembly in Pećani, near Ostružnica (6 May 1804), demanding that he personally pay the Prečanj merchants for the procured gunpowder and other war materiel, because he was the leader of the uprising. Teodosije called Karađorđe a tyrant, who tyrannizes worse than dahis. During their quarrel, he tried to kill Karađorđe, but his rifle failed and Karađorđe seriously wounded him. The wounded man was taken to Orašac, where he died a few weeks later and was buried in his native village. His grave is located in the courtyard of the Church of the Ascension of the Lord.

References 

Serbian politicians
First Serbian Uprising
1760 births
1807 deaths